The Knob School, also called the Masonic Lodge, is a historic school and Masonic lodge building on Arkansas Highway 141 in Knob, Arkansas.  It is a two-story wood-frame structure with a hip roof, and a single-story extension to the front with a hip roof and a recessed porch.  The building has vernacular Craftsman style, with extended eaves supported by exposed brackets.  It was built in 1923 to serve the dual purpose of providing the community with school facilities (located on the first floor) and space for Masonic lodge meetings (on the second floor).

The building was listed on the National Register of Historic Places in 1991 as Knob School-Masonic Lodge.

See also
National Register of Historic Places listings in Clay County, Arkansas
List of Masonic buildings in the United States

References

Clubhouses on the National Register of Historic Places in Arkansas
Buildings and structures in Clay County, Arkansas
Masonic buildings in Arkansas
National Register of Historic Places in Clay County, Arkansas